Longa may refer to:

Music
 Longa (music), a musical note twice as long in duration as a breve, appearing primarily in Early music
 Longa (Middle Eastern music), a genre in Turkish and Arabic music

People
 Francisco de Longa (1783–1842), Spanish general of the Napoleonic Wars
 Steve Longa (born 1994), American football player

Places
 Longa, Angola, a town in Angola
 Longa River (Angola) a river in Angola
 Longa-Mavinga National Park, a national park in Angola
 Longa (Greek: Λογγά), a place in Messinia, Greece, in the municipality of Aipeia
 Longa Island, an island near Gairloch in Scotland
 Longa Stacks, small islets off the west coast of Unst, Shetland, Scotland

Food
 Linga (cookie), also known as longa cookies, a sesame seed cookie from the Philippines